LG121071 (or LGD-121071) is a selective androgen receptor modulator (SARM) developed by Ligand Pharmaceuticals that was first described in 1999 and was the first orally active nonsteroidal androgen to be discovered. It is a tricyclic quinolone derivative, structurally distinct from other nonsteroidal AR agonists like andarine and enobosarm (ostarine). The drug acts as a high-affinity full agonist of the androgen receptor (AR) (Ki = 17 nM), with a potency and efficacy that is said to be equivalent to that of dihydrotestosterone (DHT). Unlike testosterone, but similarly to DHT, LG121071 and other nonsteroidal androgens cannot be potentiated by 5α-reductase in androgenic tissues (nor aromatized into estrogenic metabolites), and for this reason, show tissue-selective androgenic effects. In accordance, they are said to possess full anabolic activity with reduced androgenic activity, similarly to anabolic-androgenic steroids.

The in vitro metabolism of LG121071 has been characterized in anticipation of its possible use as a doping agent.

See also
 Acetothiolutamide
 LG-120907
 LGD-2226
 LGD-3303
 S-40503

References

Antigonadotropins
Quinolines
Selective androgen receptor modulators
Trifluoromethyl compounds